Vykhino-Zhulebino District   is an administrative district (raion) of South-Eastern Administrative Okrug, one of the 125 raions of Moscow, Russia. Population: 219,600 (2016 est.).

See also
Administrative divisions of Moscow

References

Notes

Sources

Districts of Moscow